Gaetano Fedele Polidori (1763–1853) was an Italian writer, political and scholar living in Highgate. He was the son of Agostino Ansano Polidori (1714–1778), a physician and poet who lived and practised in his native Bientina, near Pisa, Tuscany.

Polidori studied law at the University of Pisa. He became secretary to the tragedian Vittorio Alfieri in 1785 and remained with him four years.

He came to England from Paris in 1790 after resigning as Alfieri's secretary.  He settled in Highgate, working as an Italian teacher and translator. He translated various literary works, notably, John Milton's Paradise Lost and Horace Walpole's The Castle of Otranto, besides  other writings of Milton and Lucan.  He wrote prolifically, producing his own fiction, poetry, criticism, and tragedies.
He also set up a private press at his home, where amongst other works (mostly his own), he printed the first editions of some poems by his grandchildren, Dante Gabriel Rossetti and Christina Rossetti.  
He also printed an edition of the poem Osteologia, which his father Agostino Ansano Polidori had written in 1763.

He retired to a house in Holmer Green, Buckinghamshire in 1836.

Family

On 29 January 1793, Gaetano Polidori  married an English governess, Anna Maria Pierce of Middlesex (b. c. 1774), and they had four children. 
His oldest son John William Polidori was a physician to Lord Byron and author of the first vampire story in English, The Vampyre (1819).

His daughter Frances (Frances Mary Lavinia Polidori, 27 April 1800 – 8 April 1886) in 1826 married exiled Italian scholar Gabriele Rossetti. They had four children, Maria Francesca Rossetti, Dante Gabriel Rossetti, William Michael Rossetti and Christina Georgina Rossetti. After Gabriele's death in 1854, Frances quickly burned the remaining copies of his book Il Mistero dell' Amor Platonico del Medio Evo. Frances herself died in 1886 and was buried in the family plot at Highgate Cemetery.

Maria (1827–1876), wrote a book about Dante Alighieri and later became an Anglican nun.

Gabriel Charles Dante (1828–1882) and William Michael (1829–1919)  were among the co-founders of the Pre-Raphaelite Brotherhood.  Frances sat for Gabriel for some of his early paintings, for example, The Girlhood of Mary Virgin, in which she modelled for Saint Anne.

Christina Georgina (1830–1894)  became famous as a poet and is probably best known as the author of the poem Goblin Market.

References

Doughty, Oswald (1949). Dante Gabriel Rossetti: A Victorian Romantic. New Haven: Yale University Press. 
Packer, L. M. (1963). Christina Rossetti. Berkeley: University of California Press.
Toynbee, P. J. (1909).  Dante in English Literature from Chaucer to Cary. London: Metheun.
Waller, Ross Douglas (1932).  The Rossetti Family, 1824-1854. Manchester: Manchester University Press.

1764 births
1853 deaths
People from the Province of Pisa
People from Highgate
Polidori-Rossetti family
Writers from Tuscany
Italian emigrants to the Kingdom of Great Britain
18th-century Italian writers
18th-century Italian male writers
19th-century Italian writers
19th-century Italian male writers
Private press movement
Private press movement people